Justin D. LeHew (born 2 January 1970 in Columbus Grove, Ohio) is a United States Marine who served in the War on Terror. He was awarded the Navy Cross for his actions on 23 and 24 March 2003 during the initial 2003  invasion of Iraq. He was hand picked to spearhead the rescue operation and recovery of the U.S. Army's 507th Maintenance Company on 23 March and subsequently was called upon again to take part in the rescue operation of US Army Private Jessica Lynch on 1 April 2003.  He is also a recipient of the Bronze Star with Combat Distinguishing Device denoting Valor for his heroic actions from 5 to 28 August 2004 during the Battle of Najaf.

Marine Corps career
LeHew was born on 2 January 1970 in Columbus Grove, Ohio and enlisted in the Marine Corps 11 July 1988. After graduating recruit training at Marine Corps Recruit Depot Parris Island, South Carolina, as a private first class, LeHew reported to Marine Corps Base Camp Pendleton, California for training as an assault amphibian crewman.

Upon completion of school in January 1989, LeHew received orders to report to Company A, 2nd Assault Amphibian Battalion at Marine Corps Base Camp Lejeune, North Carolina and deployed with Company A in the spring of 1989 to Okinawa before moving to H&S Company in the fall of the same year to deploy with UNITAS 31 throughout South America.

Upon returning from South America as a lance corporal, LeHew immediately deployed to Southwest Asia with the battalion in January 1991 and participated in Operation Desert Storm.

After returning to the states in July 1991 as a corporal, LeHew transferred to Company C for service as an assault amphibian vehicle crew chief. He then deployed with the 26th Marine Expeditionary Unit as a section leader in April 1993 and participated in Operation Provide Promise and Operation Deny Flight in Bosnia-Herzegovina.

In January 1994, as a sergeant, LeHew received orders back to Camp Pendleton for duty as an instructor at the Assault Amphibian School.

From January 1994 to October 1996, LeHew served in a variety of billets at the school ranging from crew chief, class commander, platoon sergeant and classroom instructor and was named Instructor of the Year for two consecutive years at the school.  He also attended the Basic Vehicle Repairman Course during this time and received a secondary military occupational specialty as an AAV mechanic.

In October 1996, LeHew graduated Drill Instructor School at MCRD San Diego and reported to Company G, 2nd Recruit Training Battalion, where he served as drill instructor, senior drill instructor and academics instructor.  During this period, as a staff sergeant, LeHew was a two-time winner of the Dan Daly Award, which is presented to the most inspirational drill instructor.

From January 2000 to October 2002, as a gunnery sergeant, LeHew returned to Camp LeJeune for duty as a platoon sergeant with Company D, 2nd Assault Amphibian Battalion.

In October 2002, LeHew transferred to Company A for service as platoon sergeant for 3rd platoon and deployed in January 2003 to Operation Iraqi Freedom with Regimental Combat Team 2 and Task Force Tarawa.  On March 23, 2003, LeHew was an assault amphibian vehicle platoon sergeant who was leading an armored column into the city of Nasiriyah when he was called upon to rescue the remaining soldiers of the ill-fated US Army 507th Maintenance Company led by Captain Troy King, who was ambushed just hours earlier.  After the Marine column rescued the soldiers, the attack continued into the streets of the city where, during a day of unrelenting and viscous house-to-house, street-to-street, close-quarters urban combat, he bolstered a defensive perimeter to repel numerous waves of Saddam Fedayeen attackers, directed tank and infantry fires, rescued or retrieved 7 more US marines after their vehicle was destroyed by rocket-propelled grenade fire and coordinated an air medical evacuation of all wounded and dead US troops during the fight for the Southern Bridge in the city.  LeHew was also later involved in the rescue and recovery operation of US Army Private Jessica Lynch from the hospital in Nasiriya.  During this battle, LeHew was awarded the Navy Cross for heroic actions in close-quarters combat in the city as well as calmly calling in air strikes and tank/infantry fires to neutralize enemy targets in the midst of chaos.  In an incredible show of determination and strength, it was witnessed by multiple marines that LeHew personally carried a "6'4", 240 lb severely wounded Marine corporal to safety over a distance of 200 yards under a hailstorm of small arms, machine gun and rocket-propelled grenade fire, saving the man's life.

In June 2003, LeHew received orders to transfer once again back to Camp Pendleton for service with Company A, 3rd Assault Amphibian Battalion as company operations chief.

In January 2004 LeHew reported for duty as company first sergeant, Company C, 1st Battalion, 4th Marines (1/4) and immediately deployed in May 2004 with BLT 1/4 in support of Operation Iraqi Freedom II.  He distinguished himself in combat once again during the battle of Najaf from 5 to 28 August 2004, earning the Bronze Star with combat distinguishing device for his heroic actions against the Mahdi Army of Moqtada al-Sadr.  He is most notably remembered by his men for purposely exposing himself on numerous occasions to draw enemy sniper fire away from his men to allow them to maneuver and neutralize the enemy position, ultimately saving many Marines' lives, in addition to personally treating and carrying a marine out of the Wadi A Salaam cemetery in his arms with a sucking chest wound over 100 meters under fire, saving his marine's life.

LeHew transferred to 1st Reconnaissance Battalion upon return to CONUS and served as both Company A and Company D first sergeant simultaneously for a two-year period in addition to reactivating 1st Force Reconnaissance Company. Upon promotion to sergeant major in the fall of 2007, LeHew was personally requested by the division to remain on as the battalion sergeant major and deploy the battalion once again to Iraq for combat operations.  LeHew transferred from the battalion upon return to the United States in March 2010 and was assigned to the Assault Amphibian School.  LeHew transferred from the Assault Amphibian School in April 2011 and was assigned as the regimental sergeant major of the 3rd Marine Regiment in Kaneohe Bay Hawaii.  In July 2013, LeHew was selected to serve as the Training and Education Command (TECOM) sergeant major located at Marine Corps Base Quantico, Virginia, and remained in that position until his retirement form the United States Marine Corps

In 2010, LeHew was honored by the corps with an obstacle named in his honor at Marine Corps Recruit Depot Parris Island, South Carolina.  "LeHew's Challenge" is an 8 ft high suspended log supported by two pedestals that is part of the famed 54-hour crucible event which culminates the basic training of a United States Marine.  Every recruit, both male and female, hear from their drill instructors about the heroism displayed by then LeHew and the story is used to inspire Marine recruits to work together to overcome the obstacle and complete the task at hand.

LeHew was inducted into the Ohio Military Hall of Fame on 4 May 2012.

Since his retirement, LeHew has become a major player in the world of MIA search and recovery operations for the United States of America and currently is the chief operating officer for the world's most successful, private, MIA search and recovery organization, History Flight.  In 2019 alone, this organization successfully located and recovered 86 missing US servicemen, in both the Pacific and European theaters of operation from World War Two and returned them to their families.

Navy Cross citation

For Services as Set Forth in the Following Citation:

Military Awards

See also

List of U.S. Marines

References

External links

1970 births
Living people
United States Marine Corps personnel of the Iraq War
People from Columbus Grove, Ohio
Recipients of the Navy Cross (United States)
Recipients of the Legion of Merit
United States Marines